Ren Jialun (born Ren Guochao on 11 April 1989), also known as Allen Ren, is a Chinese actor and singer. He is best known for his historical drama The Glory of Tang Dynasty (2017), Under The Power (2019), Forever and Ever, One and Only (2021), as well as The Blue Whisper and Thousand Years for You (2022).

Biography
Ren was born in Qingdao, Shandong Province. His talent as a child was reflected in table tennis. He started playing at the age of 6 and was selected to the Shandong provincial team at the age of 13 due to his outstanding performance. Ren was a professional table tennis player, who trained alongside Zhou Yu and Zhang Jike. However, he had to quit the sport due to injuries.

After graduating from high school, Ren worked in airport ground handling and flight attendant work at Qingdao Liuting International Airport. And because of hard work and conscientious training, the airport and its alma mater issued an advocacy of "learning the work spirit of Ren Guochao". And Ren, who loves music and dance, also uses his spare time to learn to sing and dance, in order to chase and practice his dreams. In 2008, he began to participate in various draft competitions to exercise himself. Later, he won the support of his family and officially resigned from the airport, opening another road of life.

Prior to beginning his acting career, Ren participated in Hunan TV's Super Boy and Korean Star. He was originally planned to debut in a Chinese-South Korean boy group, but quit in 2014 due to unknown reasons.

Career
In 2014, Ren filmed his first television drama Detective Dee, where he played the leading role of Di Renjie. The drama was delayed and only aired in 2017. In 2016, Ren featured in the fantasy action drama Noble Aspirations and crime drama Memory Lost.

Ren rose to fame in 2017, after starring in the historical drama The Glory of Tang Dynasty. His portrayal of Li Chu left a deep impression on audiences, and he received rave reviews for his acting. He received the Best Actor award at the 4th Hengdian Film and TV Festival of China.

In 2018, Ren starred in the fantasy romance drama The Destiny of White Snake, based on the renowned Chinese folktale, playing Xu Xian.

In 2019, Ren starred in the wuxia drama  Under The Power.

In 2020, Ren starred in the republican spy drama Autumn Cicada.

In 2021, Ren starred in the Chinese drama Miss Crow with Mr Lizard alongside Xing Fei,  as his Co-star. The drama received many positive reviews in Asia and all worldwide. Ren also starred in One and Only and its sequel, Forever and Ever with Bai Lu as his Co star, which making both very popular recently. In the same year, he was cast in the drama Twilight alongside Angelababy.

In 2022, Ren starred with Dilraba Dilmurat in The Blue Whisper, a fantasy romance drama. And a newly broadcast fantasy Republican Era drama, Thousand Years For You where Ren starred with Li Qin.

Personal life

Real name anecdote 
Ren Jialun's real name is Ren Guochao. Because of his down-to-earth name, he once became the first artist to top Weibo's hot search due to "failure to change his name".

Ren Guochao is not the only hidden name of Ren Jialun. He is most famous for the fact that one person can form the "RGC411 Heavenly Group". This group is composed of his multi-oriented former names, and one of the representatives of the group is Ren Yaoxi, who can sing and dance well. This name is derived from when Ren Jialun went to Japan for development, because the word "good" in Japan is "yaoxi", which is homonym for "Yaoxi" and has the meaning of shining star.

Marriage 
On March 7, 2017, Weibo announced their relationship.

On February 2, 2018, Weibo announced the child's photo, announcing that he officially became a father.

Guochao anthology 
From 2007 to 2009, Ren wrote down his thoughts and thoughts about life on his blog. After gradually gaining attention, they were collected and compiled into an autobiography called Guo Chao Collection.

Filmography

Television series

Discography

Singles

Awards and nominations

References

External links
 

1989 births
Living people
21st-century Chinese male actors
Chinese male television actors
Super Boy contestants
Male actors from Shandong